Ramzi Ben Younès (born May 31, 1978 in Tunis) is a Tunisian footballer who last played for Al Naser in Kuwait.

References

External links
 

1978 births
Living people
Tunisian footballers
Tunisian expatriate footballers
Espérance Sportive de Tunis players
Olympique Béja players
Al-Fateh SC players
Al-Nasr SC (Kuwait) players
Tunisian Ligue Professionnelle 1 players
Saudi Professional League players
Kuwait Premier League players
Association football defenders
Expatriate footballers in Kuwait
Expatriate footballers in Saudi Arabia
Tunisian expatriate sportspeople in Kuwait
Tunisian expatriate sportspeople in Saudi Arabia